Evyatar Iluz (born 4 November 1983 in Be'er Sheva), also known as Evya, is an Israeli former professional footballer that has played in Hapoel Be'er Sheva.

References

External links
 

1983 births
Living people
Israeli footballers
Hapoel Be'er Sheva F.C. players
Hapoel Petah Tikva F.C. players
Israeli Premier League players
Liga Leumit players
Footballers from Beersheba
Israeli people of Moroccan-Jewish descent
Association football defenders